Athens is a city and the county seat of Athens County, Ohio. The population was 23,849 at the 2020 census. It is the principal city of the Athens micropolitan area.

Athens is a qualified Tree City USA as recognized by the National Arbor Day Foundation.

History 

The first permanent European settlers arrived in Athens in 1797, more than a decade after the United States victory in the American Revolutionary War. In 1800, the town site was first surveyed and plotted and incorporated as a village in 1811. Ohio had become a state in 1803. Ohio University was chartered in 1804, the first public institution of higher learning in the Northwest Territory. Previously part of Washington County, Ohio, Athens County was formed in 1805, named for the ancient center of learning, Athens, Greece.

Ohio University in Athens was established with the first federal endowment of an educational institution in the United States. In July 1787, the Congress of the Confederation gave to the Ohio Company of Associates "two townships of good land for the support of a literary institution" in the newly created Northwest Territory.

During The First Session of the Second Territorial General Assembly, held in Chillicothe from November 23, 1801, to January 23, 1802, the General Assembly passed an act establishing the "American Western University" at Athens. The act was approved by Arthur St. Clair, Governor of the Northwest Territory on January 9, 1802. However, no university with the name of American Western University would be established. Ohio became a state in 1803 and on February 18, 1804, the state legislature passed an act establishing the "Ohio University" in the town of Athens. Athens received city status in 1912, following the 1910 census showing the population had passed 5,000 residents, the requirement for city status in Ohio.

Originally, large tracts of land in Athens and Alexander Townships were set aside through a contract between the Congress (under the Articles of Confederation) and the Ohio Company of Associates, a group of American Revolutionary War veterans. These lands were given to Ohio University by the Federal government. This was the first federal land grant for a university, pre-dating the Morrill Act by more than 70 years. At first, lands were mostly leased out, but the failure of many lessors to pay their rents resulted in most of the land being sold. The sale of these lands funded the growth of Ohio University. Today it is one of the largest institutions of higher learning in Ohio, with an enrollment of over 20,000 on the Athens campus and over 28,000 for all campuses.

The earliest industry in the area was salt production, followed by iron production and coal extraction. The largest employer in the county is Ohio University. In 1843, the Hocking Canal opened, enabling shipping from the Ohio River up the Hocking River, which passes through Athens, to Nelsonville, Ohio, and points beyond. However, the canal was closed during cold winters when it froze over.

The first railroad reached Athens in 1857. In the late 19th century, an interurban line opened between Athens and Nelsonville and operated for some years. The Athens Lunatic Asylum, later named the Athens State Hospital, opened in 1874. This was on high ground to the south of town and to the south of the Hocking River. In the late 19th century the hospital was the town's largest employer. The state hospital was eventually decommissioned and the property was deeded to Ohio University. It is now known as The Ridges. Much of the building space has been renovated for offices and research space, and most of the grounds have been set aside as open space, including a land lab.

In 1904, the U. S. Army and the Ohio National Guard conducted joint training exercises near the city. Multiple US army regulars became drunk and were arrested by National Guard Provosts for causing disturbances. The arrests angered the regulars; on Friday a large contingent set out from camp to free an arrested comrade. The armed regulars were stopped by provosts and the ensuing quarrel quickly escalated into a shoot-out on Washington Street, during which one guardsman was killed and five others were wounded.

By 1935, Athens was known as a coal and fruit-producing region and a state center of higher education and psychiatric care. The major manufactured goods included stoves, lumber, parquetry flooring, caskets, and flooring.

The university (and in turn, the city) saw large growth during the post-World War Two era and again during the Vietnam War era. Growth slowed in the 1980s with small increases in growth into present times.

Geography 

Athens is located in the unglaciated Allegheny Plateau about 47 miles from Chillicothe and 35 miles west of Marietta. Athens is surrounded by hills that rise about three hundred feet from river valley to the narrow ridge tops. The county extends west from the Ohio River, mostly centered around the lower Hocking River watershed.
Large sections of Athens and Ohio University are located in the floodplain of the Hocking River. Over the last two centuries the town suffered from many destructive floods, including notable floods in 1832, 1873, 1907, 1937, 1949, 1964 and 1968. In 1969 the Army Corps of Engineers completed a major work that rerouted and expanded the channel of the Hocking River, for a stretch of several miles around the town, moving the river hundreds of feet to the south. That project and the ongoing efforts to maintain the channel have greatly reduced the negative effects of seasonally high river levels.

Athens is located mostly on and around a south-jutting ridge bordered by a loop in the Hocking River. The underlying geology is mostly sandstone and shale, including "redbed" shale that presents a severe slip hazard when structures are built over it on hillsides. However, there are safe zones above sandstone beds, most notably the Connelsville Sandstone that outcrops high on the hillsides. The old Athens Mental Hospital grounds (now part of the university) was built on the top of a hillside in the late 1860s, and is completely stable due to its position atop the hill rather than on a slope. The recent University Courtyard Apartments is also built on similar underlying geology across a small valley, but the hilltop was extensively removed in order to create a stable base. The city receives all its water supply from wells in unconsolidated river aquifers, and is reputed to be the largest city in the United States to do so.

Climate

Demographics

2010 census

As of the census of 2010, there were 23,832 people, 6,903 households, and 1,842 families residing in the city. The racial makeup of the city was 86.4% White, 4.4% African American, 0.2% Native American, 6.1% Asian, 0.6% from other races, and 2.3% from two or more races. Hispanic or Latino of any race were 2.4% of the population.

There were 6,903 households, of which 11.8% had children under the age of 18 living with them, 20.5% were married couples living together, 4.2% had a female householder with no husband present, 2.1% had a male householder with no wife present, and 73.3% were non-families. 33.8% of all households were made up of individuals, and 5% had someone living alone who was 65 years of age or older. The average household size was 2.28 and the average family size was 2.74.

The median age in the city was 21.6 years. 5.8% of residents were under the age of 18; 67.6% were between the ages of 18 and 24; 14.4% were from 25 to 44; 7.9% were from 45 to 64; and 4.3% were 65 years of age or older. The gender makeup of the city was 50.0% male and 50.0% female.

2000 census 
As of the census of 2000, there were 21,342 people, 6,271 households, and 1,906 families residing in the city. The population density was 2,560.4 people per square mile (988.0/km2). There were 6,715 housing units at an average density of 805.6 per square mile (310.9/km2). The racial makeup of the city was 89.16% White, 3.82% Black or African American, 0.15% Native American, 4.47% Asian, 0.06% Pacific Islander, 0.60% from other races, and 1.74% from two or more races. Hispanic or Latino of any race were 1.41% of the population.

There were 6,271 households, out of which 12.9% had children under the age of 18 living with them, 22.9% were married couples living together, 5.6% had a female householder with no husband present, and 69.6% were non-families. 34.5% of all households were made up of individuals, and 6.6% had someone living alone who was 65 years of age or older. The average household size was 2.25 and the average family size was 2.72.

In the city the population was spread out, with 6.7% under the age of 18, 66.7% from 18 to 24, 13.7% from 25 to 44, 8.0% from 45 to 64, and 4.9% who were 65 years of age or older. The median age was 22 years. For every 100 females, there were 88.2 males. For every 100 females age 18 and over, there were 86.9 males.

The median income for a household in the city was $17,122, and the median income for a family was $53,391. Males had a median income of $35,849 versus $28,866 for females. The per capita income for the city was $11,061. About 14.8% of families and 51.9% of the population were below the poverty line, including 19.1% of those under age 18 and 7.2% of those age 65 or over.

Economy 
From the mid-1800s until the 1950s, coal and brick-making were major sources of employment in the county. They became a minor source after the best and most available coal had been extracted and cheaper brick-making became available outside the area. A former manufacturing company was the Midget Motors Corporation, makers of the small automobile, the King Midget.

Ohio University is the largest employer in Athens County. In addition to direct employment through the University, much of the local economy depends on tourism and events related to the University, through local restaurants, bars, stores and hotels. Manufacturing and technology related businesses, including Quidel Corporation (formerly Diagnostic Hybrids), Stewart-MacDonald, Sunpower, Mitchell Electronics, Fastenall, and Gorman-Redlich.

Since the 1970s Athens has earned a reputation as one of the more progressive (liberal) communities in Southeastern Ohio. That reputation includes Democratic political leaning, presence of some international communities, support for use of alternative energy, calling for 'smart growth' development, development of small farms emphasizing sustainable and organic-produced crops, and support for local businesses. The Athens Farmers Market is open year-round.

Court Street has a number of small to large student apartment buildings. Ohio University's main 'college green' entrance is located at Court & Union. The student center (John Calhoun Baker University Center) is at one end of Court Street. Several Athens shopping areas are located outside the uptown area; the largest is on East State Street with a small mall, several shopping strip centers, large box stores, car dealerships, hotels/motels and many local and national sit-down / fast food restaurants. On the north side of town is Columbus Road area with some shopping, car dealer, motels, eateries and office buildings. On the south side, Richland Avenue has large student housing apartment complexes. West Union St. has a hospital complex, some student housing and the county fairgrounds. A large fire in Nov. 2014 damaged or destroyed six buildings on West Union (near Court St). The buildings housed businesses and upper floor student apartments, no one was hurt in the fire with one business reopened for business in early 2015 and rebuilding on the sites started in the summer of 2015.

Arts and culture

Athens has a long musical tradition that includes local acts and events for touring musicians, performing at Ohio University and festivals in Athens. The folk song "Athens County" - words by Joe Dolce; music by Jonathan Edwards - refers to Athens, Ohio, where Edwards & Dolce attended college in the late 60s. Edwards went on to have a Number 2 hit song nationally with 'Sunshine' while Dolce moved to Australia and had an international Number 1 hit with Shaddap You Face. Dolce is now an established poet and essayist in Mebourne. Bands hailing from Athens include The Headstone Circus, The Snapdragons, Appalachian Death Ride, She Bears, Southeast Engine, The Ridges and the metal band Skeletonwitch. Athens native Steve Reis, a founder of the Columbus, Ohio-based band McGuffey Lane named his band after a street in Athens. In 1973, the Ohio Valley Summer Theater began a production called the Appalachian Green Parks Project. It featured music, dance, and theater derived from the Appalachian region. The group won the Governor's Award for Community Action, released an album of music, performed at the Sylvan Amphitheater in Washington, D.C., on July 4, 1974, made numerous television appearances, provided the soundtrack for an Ohio Department Of Natural Resources public service film titled Sweet Ohio, were designated as the official Bicentennial Touring Group for the state of Ohio, and were the subject of a documentary film during their four-year run. Two former members of the Appalachian Green Parks Project, Jim McGaw and Charlie Lewis began performing with Jimmy Prouty and went on to form the New Vinton County Frogwhompers Marching, Singing, Strumming and Plucking Society in 1976, which was to become one of the most popular groups to come out of the region in the 1970s. Several theater companies have operated in Athens over the years. Studio for Young Actors, aka Drama Club Youth Academy was a youth theater which operated from 2000 to approximately 2010. They performed both original and published plays and musicals featuring young actors. Their main venue was Stuart's Opera House in Nelsonville, Ohio They subsequently moved their performance venue to Arts/West a community arts space in Athens, Ohio, operated by the City of Athens. A University park on Richland Ave was designed by Athens' own Maya Lin.

Museums

 Athens County Historical Society and Museum DBA The Southeast Ohio History Center: Historic items relating to life in Athens County
 The Dairy Barn Arts Center: Contemporary arts and crafts.
 Kennedy Museum of Art at Ohio University: Major collections include Southwest Native American textiles and jewelry. Contemporary prints.
 Ohio Valley Museum of Discovery: Interactive children's center.

Annual festivals

 Athens is home to the annual Halloween Block Party, a massive international spectacle that draws attention from news media across the world each year. Ohio University's citation as the world's most haunted institution of higher education by the British Psychical Institute; Athens's citation as one of the 10 most haunted American cities; and the annual Halloween celebration, have dually added to Athens's reputation as one of the 10 most terrifying places on Earth and the "World Capital of Halloween." Athens was vaunted as one of the top fifteen most haunted cities in America on the Fox Family Channel special "Scariest Places On Earth" that aired on October 23, 2000. Locals with knowledge of the history of The Ridges criticized the Fox portrayal as sensationalistic and misleading on details of the situation. The block party has welcomed more guests each year, and festivities and security have grown in it for that reason. The event caters to roughly 20,000 to 30,000 dressed up partygoers on four closed blocks of uptown streets.
 Blackout Fest is held annually at The Union Bar & Grill and features many local, national, and international indie rock acts.
 The Athens Community Music Festival is held each August. In 2017 two dozen local bands were involved.
 Concert "Under the Elms" is held on the OU College Green from June until early July with the 'Communiversity Band' (made up of OU faculty, students, alumni as well as community members)
 For many years, an annual Springfest was held on the OU Campus. Primarily due to changes in state alcohol laws, it was replaced by an annual event at Ervin's Big Red Barn (and field), a private "party-farm" just outside the city. After the move, the festival was called Derby days. The organization who coordinated the event was removed from campus in 2003. Starting in 2004, Ohio University Seniors Dominic Petrozzi and Timothy Kehoe created One Fest. The festival name is changed each year to represent the number of years it has been held (for example, 2011 was 8Fest). As of 9 Fest, the event has been held at its new location on West Union Street, just outside the campus. It has become one of the largest independent collegiate music festivals in the country, boasting previous performances by national recording artists such as Mike Posner, Machine Gun Kelly, Timeflies, Chip Tha Ripper, Wiz Khalifa, Kendrick Lamar, Steve Aoki and more. in 2008, the name of the festival was changed to "The Number Fest" with an updated "edition" for each year it takes place. Number Fest - 14th Edition will be held on April 16, 2016. 
 Lobsterfest is an annual free concert hosted by the university's All Campus Radio Network.
 Since 1983, the 970WATH-Power 105 Chili Bowl has been an annual event and each year raises money for a charity. Currently it takes place in October, at The Market on State.
 Hookah in the hills, an annual festival held twice a year at Poston Lake Music Park in the Spring and Fall, featuring the Columbus-based band Ekoostik Hookah, as well as other local bands.
 The annual Athens International Film and Video Festival is one of the few festivals that are on the official list of Academy Award-qualifying festivals.
Ohio Brew Week, founded in 2005 as a way to increase commerce in the town of Athens while students were away for summer, has grown into a nine-day festival including dozens of Ohio craft breweries and hundreds of beers. Notable attendees have included Brooklyn Brewery president Steve Hindy and co-founder of Great Lakes Brewing Company Pat Conway. Events typically include keg tappings, live performances at local venues, and the "last call" street festival.

Parks and recreation 

Athens recreation facilities include a community recreation center, several city parks and play grounds, public gardens, soccer fields, an arts center called Arts West, two off-leash enclosed dog parks, and an extensive scenic trail system in the city lands, adjacent Strouds Run State Park, and the Blair Preserve owned by the Athens Conservancy. The Athens Skate Park is the second largest skate park in Ohio. The City of Athens Ohio Community Recreation center (Athens Community Center), known simply as "The Rec Center" to locals, offers programming in athletics, childcare, sports camps, community events and more. Located in the East State Street area, the center is accessible from the Hockhocking Adena Bikeway. Recreation facilities include an outdoor swimming pool, a skate park, fitness equipment, an indoor walking and running track, event rental facilities, and playgrounds. The Arts, Parks and Recreation Department actively supports a variety of community recreation initiatives. It sponsors adult summer and fall slow-pitch softball that is popular among residents in Athens and the county. The recreation department has organized men's, women's, and co-ed leagues, although the co-ed leagues have seen strongest participation in recent years. Soccer leagues are organized year round, with programs offered through the Community Recreation Center, Ohio University and the Athens Soccer Academy. Youth sports, such as soccer leagues, summer camps and little league, are also supported by local residents. Programming for the arts are facilitated through Arts West, the Dairy Barn, and Ohio University. Sells Park is located on the east side of Athens, near The City of Athens Ohio Community Recreation center. Sells Park comprises 22.5 acres (980,491.87 ft²), and includes Sells Pond, a 1,876.03 square yard (1,568.60 m2) pond. Strouds Run State Park is located just outside the city, bordering the city line. This park features  of wooded hills, including many bluffs and rock shelters, centered around a man-made lake. Camping is available. Both Sells Park and Strouds Run State Park are part of The Athens Trail Network, a multi-use trail network branching out from Sells Park. This preserve includes an 85-acre (340,000 m2) old-growth forest known as "Hawk Woods", or, more formally, the Dale & Jacki Riddle State Nature Preserve. Also adjacent to the state park is the  Blair Preserve, owned by the Athens Conservancy.

The Hockhocking Adena Bikeway is a multi-use asphalt trail with its main hub (mile marker 0) at the Athens Community Center on East State Street. Access points with parking are located at mile 4 at the West State Street Park, mile 10.2 off Rt. 682 in The Plains, and mile 16.4 at Robbins' Crossing and Hocking College. The trail, which generally follows the course of the Hocking River, provides access to the East State Street commercial areas, Ohio University's campus (at South Green and Peden Stadium), The Plains, and Hocking College. It is designed for walking, running, biking, cross-country skiing, skating, and wheelchairs. Additionally several city streets are marked as bike lanes.

Trails 

The Athens Trail Network is a multi-use trail network branching out from Sells Park at the end of Avon Place. A series of twelve trails and connectors branch out into the surrounding woods, heading eastwards to eventually connect with the trails of Strouds Run State Park. The trails are designed for hiking, running, and biking, although some sections are off-limits to bicycles. The trails provide scenic views of the East State Street commercial area and travel past and through notable features such as Sells Pond, Riddle State Nature Preserve (also known as Hawk Woods), Boulder Cove, Turtlehead Cave (also known as Blue Ash Rockhouse), Finger Rock, Pioneer Cemetery, and Dow Lake at Strouds Run State Park. The trail network is maintained by community and university volunteers.

Government

Athens is governed by a mayoral-council form of government. Elected officials include mayor, auditor, treasurer, seven council members, and council president. The mayor, auditor, and treasurer are elected for four-year terms. Council members and council president are elected for two-year terms. Four council members represent each of the city's four wards. Three council members are elected at-large. Council president only votes in case of a tie vote. City Hall is located in uptown on Washington Street.

Athens is also covered by the Athens County Department of Health, the Athens County Planning Office, and Athens County Job and Family Services. The city of Athens has a strict parking policy. The city has a professional Police Department since 1911 working 24/7 year round. Today the force is made up of about 30 Officers plus a like number of reserve officers and support staff. Ohio University also has a police force with about 25 officers. Each of these departments work well together and support each other. Both have additional help when needed by the county sheriff department. Athens Fire department founded in 1830 and became full-time in the 1930s has two stations, a staff of about 30. They work 24 on 48 hours off. The department not only covers the cities fire department needs but also that of Ohio University. The city is part of the county-wide Enhanced 911 system. This system is able to locate landline or registered cell phone users, and send a text or phone call message of alert to those who sign up.

The city has a large number of rental homes/apartments which are inspected by the Housing Code Office.
The city of Athens is the county seat making it the home of many county government offices and the county courthouse at the corner of Court and Washington streets. Each of Athens County's three commissioners are usually from the city of Athens. Athens is a stronghold of the Democratic Party. President Barack Obama visited the city and Ohio University late during the 2012 re-election campaign. The city and Athens County have voted Democratic during all presidential elections since 1972 except for 1984.

Education 

Ohio University is a public university located in Athens (30,000+ students) that is situated on an  campus. Founded in 1804, it is the oldest university in Ohio, oldest in the Northwest Territory, and ninth oldest public university in the United States. Known as the Bobcats, Ohio University hosts over 250 academic programs, 5,300 employees, and has been recognized by the John Templeton Foundation as one of the top character building institutions in the country. In addition to its main campus in Athens, Ohio University also operates regional campuses in Chillicothe, Cleveland, Dublin, Ironton (Ohio University - Southern), Lancaster, Pickerington, Proctorville, St. Clairsville (Ohio University - Eastern), and Zanesville.

Outside of Ohio University, the residents of Athens are served by the Athens City School District, founded in the late 1840s, made up of five elementary buildings: Pre-K (Chauncey), K-6 (East, Morrison-Gordon, The Plains & West), a Middle School (grades 7-8) and Athens High School home of the 'Bulldogs'. A large tax levy was passed in 2018 to demolish and reconstruct East, Morrison, and the high school. The Plains Elementary & Athens Middle School will be renovated. When complete, West will be closed.

On the city's east side, Athens has a public library, a branch of the Athens County Public Libraries.

Media 

 The Athens Messenger, Athens' oldest newspaper, founded in 1848. Published five days per week.
 The Athens News, a free weekly newspaper
 The Post, the student newspaper of Ohio University
 The New Political, digital student-run publication at Ohio University covering politics.
 The Matrix, the student newspaper of Athens High School
 Athens Community Television Public access television, Spectrum cable, Channel 1021
 The Government Channel Athens city government television, Spectrum cable, Channel 1024
 WEAK-LP-FM, 106.7, "Union Station" (oldies)
 WYWH-LP-FM, 104.5 FM (Christian) (3ABN Radio Network)
 FM Public Radio: WOUB-FM, 91.3 FM, NPR Affiliate, BBC, American Public Media, contemporary adult alternative music
 AM Public Radio: WOUB-AM, 1340 AM, Ohio University student-operated radio station
 Public Television: WOUB-TV, Channels 20.1, 20.2, 20.3, 20.4, 20.5, 20.6, PBS affiliate
 WATH-AM, 970 AM (oldies) (Athens; Flagship of Ohio University & Copperhead Baseball & Athens High School Football & Basketball)
 WATH-FM 97.1 FM (Athens; 70s and 80s pop-rock music)
 WXTQ-FM, 105.5 (CHR) (Athens; Flagship of Ohio University Men's Basketball and Football & local area high school games)
 WJKW, 95.9 FM (Athens; Contemporary Christian format)

Infrastructure

Transportation 
Railroad came to the city in the 1850s, with the last passenger train ending in 1981. That left a few freight trains passing near the city. Until 1981, Amtrak's Shenandoah (Cincinnati - Washington, D.C.) stopped at Athens station. In earlier years, the daily B&O trains, Diplomat (St. Louis - Jersey City, NJ) and National Limited (St. Louis - Jersey City, NJ) stopped at the station. 

The first 4-lane road into and out of the city came in the early 1970s. SR 32 from Athens to Cincinnati was completed in the early 80's. Four lanes from Athens to Belpre/Parkersburg was completed in the late 1990s on US-50, SR-32 & 7 hooking up with I-77. In the early 2000s, SR-33 'Super-2' highway was complete, linking Athens to I-77 at Ravenswood, WVa. In October 2013, the last section of the 4-lane highway was completed, bypassing Nelsonville's two lane road on SR-33, linking Athens with Columbus.

Ohio University has a modern regional airport about 15 miles southwest of the city near Albany off US-50/SR-32 called Gordon K. Bush Airport. The runway is just over 5,000 feet long with landing system, lighting and hangars. The nearest airports with commercial flights are Mid-Ohio Valley Regional Airport near Parkersburg, West Virginia and John Glenn Columbus International Airport and Rickenbacker International Airport near Columbus.

Athens has a public bus system which is free to OU students & staff and at a reduced price for seniors & school age students. It has several routes inside the city and one to The Plains. OU has a bus system that links with a city bus system. Many student apartment complexes have their own bus shuttle. Athens also has an inter-city bus line from Athens to Columbus, Cincinnati, Marietta, Ohio, and Cleveland running twice a day with stops in-between.

Health care

At Ohio University the Heritage College of Osteopathic Medicine was established in 1975. It is currently the only osteopathic medical school in the state and offers the degree Doctor of Osteopathic Medicine (D.O.). The college is accredited by the American Osteopathic Association. In 1993, Barbara Ross-Lee, D.O., was appointed to the position of dean of the Heritage College of Osteopathic Medicine; she was the first African-American woman to serve as the dean of a U.S. medical school. The Heritage College of Osteopathic Medicine has 814 students enrolled across three campuses in Athens, Cleveland, and Dublin. Ohio University partners with University Medical Associates (UMA), which was founded in 2003, and is a wide-ranging medical service provider in multiple locations around the Athens area, both on campus and off. UMA's mission is to deliver health care services to the residents of southeastern Ohio while providing clinical training opportunities for future osteopathic physicians.

Ohio University also runs Campus Care, which is an on-campus clinic for enrolled students.

Additionally, Athens is served by OhioHealth O'Bleness Memorial Hospital a 140+ bed non-profit community hospital founded in the early 1920s as Sheltering Arms Hospital. O'Bleness, built in the early 1970s, overlooks the Hocking River and is near the University campus. O'Bleness emergency department (as well as the lab & radiology) is open 24/7 365 days at year. The hospital has a helipad located near the ED. On the hospital grounds is the Cornwell Center, which houses a catheterization lab, cardiac/pulmonary rehabilitation program as well as medical offices. The Castrop Center houses Athens Cancer Center, medical offices plus a public pharmacy. A new 2 story Doctor's Park building open in 2021 with doctor offices, including exams and Lab. O'Bleness was in a management agreement with OhioHealth from 2010 until early 2014 when O'Bleness became a whole part of the OhioHealth system. In early 2021 a new 2 story Medical Office building opened. Between 2019-2021 a new ICU opened, numerous equipment and facilities upgrades, and major expansion and renovation of the ED.

Hopewell Health Centers operate several health care facilities in Athens, including Athens Behavioral Health and Primary Care Clinic (90 Hospital Drive), Respite Adult Crisis Program (7976 Dairy Lane), Athens County WIC Program (215 Columbus Road, Suite 106), and Early Childhood Program (9 Kenny Drive). Hopewell Health Centers offer comprehensive behavioral health care, dental health care, and primary health care. A sliding fee scale is available for dental health care, primary health care, and some behavioral health care services. Board Certified/Board Eligible health professionals include family practice physicians, dentists, adult psychiatrists, child and adolescent psychiatrists, nurse practitioners, and advanced practice nurses. Hopewell also employs social workers, counselors, psychologists, chemical dependency counselors, and a registered dietician.
 
Holzer Athens, (2131 East State Street) employs 42 health care professionals at its clinic. Their service line includes allergy and immunology, anesthesiology, audiology, breast health, cancer care, chiropractic care, ear, nose & throat, eye care, gastroenterology, gynecology, heart & vascular care, imaging & radiology, kidney care, lab services, low-dose CT, men's health, midwifery, occupational health & wellness, orthopedics, pain management, pediatrics, pharmacy, podiatry, pregnancy & birth, primary care, sleep medicine, sports medicine, surgery, therapy services, urgent care, women's health, and work health & wellness.

Notable people 

 Joe Burrow, professional football player in the National Football League (NFL) and 2019 Heisman Trophy winner
 Earl Cranston, bishop in the Methodist Episcopal Church
 Joe Dolce, musician and poet
 Eilaf Egap, chemist and professor 
 Dow Finsterwald, professional golfer best known for winning the 1958 PGA Championship
 Israel Moore Foster, U.S. representative from Ohio
 Atul Gawande, surgeon who has written extensively on medicine and public health
 Kevin Hartman, professional soccer player
 David Hostetler, sculptor
 Elizabeth Orpha Sampson Hoyt (1828–1912), philosopher, author, lecturer
 Stephen Kappes, Deputy Director of the Central Intelligence Agency during the George W. Bush and Barack Obama administrations
 Ralph C. Kenney, college coach and sports administrator
 John Lefelhocz, artist and quilter
 Maya Lin, architect and designer of the Vietnam Veterans Memorial
 Tan Lin, writer and artist
 Jon Loomis, poet and writer
 Sandy Plunkett, comic book artist
 Scott Stricklin, college baseball head coach 
 Fred Swearingen, NFL referee
 Art Tripp, percussionist noted for his work with Frank Zappa and Captain Beefheart, among others
 David Wilhelm, chairman of the Democratic National Committee from 1993 to 1994
Jane Corner Young, composer
Skeletonwitch, an American metal band

References

Further reading 
 Beatty, Elizabeth G. and Marjorie S. Stone. Getting to Know Athens County. Athens, Ohio: The Stone House (1984)
 Daniel, Robert L. Athens, Ohio: The Village Years. Athens, Ohio: Ohio University Press (1997)

External links 

 
 City website

 
Cities in Athens County, Ohio
County seats in Ohio
Populated places established in 1811
1811 establishments in Ohio
Cities in Ohio